"", better known in English as "Shadows of Forgotten Ancestors", is a song by Ukrainian singer Alina Pash. The song was scheduled to represent Ukraine at the Eurovision Song Contest 2022, after winning Vidbir 2022, Ukraine's national final.

Background 
The song shares the name of a 1965 movie, Shadows of Forgotten Ancestors. The music video features artwork of the characters, along with Ukrainian writers Lesya Ukrainka and Iryna Vilde.

The first verse talks about the history of Ukraine, featuring a long history of war that plagued the country. Ancient Slavic gods Perun and Dazhbog heard cries of the Ukrainian people, peace was eventually brought to the country. With peace, new communities would form and rise. The chorus brings a message of unity to the people in Ukraine. The song then compares Ukraine's past to Dante's Divine Comedy, saying that Dante could have instead written a Divine Tragedy. The song ends with a message that says that peace is the only way out, and that Ukrainians can create a better future for themselves instead of being dependent on the tragedies of the past.

Vidbir 2022 

The selection of the competing entries for  took place over three stages. In the first stage, artists and songwriters had the opportunity to apply for the competition through an online submission form. Twenty-seven acts were longlisted and announced on 17 January 2022. The second stage was a scheduled audition at designated dates and featured the twenty-seven acts in the longlist. Eight acts were selected to advance, which were announced on 24 January 2022. The third stage was the final, which took place on 12 February 2022 and featured the eight acts vying to represent Ukraine in Turin.

Artists and composers had the opportunity to submit their entries between 14 December 2021 and 10 January 2022. Only artists that had not performed in a concert in Russia since 2014 and entered the territory of Crimea were able to apply for the competition. A selection panel including the music producer of the show Mykhailo Koshevy and the television producer of the show Oleksiy Honcharenko reviewed the 284 received submissions, and twenty-seven entries that had been longlisted were announced on 17 January 2022. Auditions were later held at the My Dream Space venue in Kyiv where eight entries were shortlisted to compete in the national final. On 24 January 2022, the eight selected competing acts were announced. On the final, held on 12 February 2022, Pash resulted as the winner, but she ultimately declined her position after being involved in a controversy for having breached the rule barring  competitors from having traveled to Russia or Crimea. The document of proof of how she entered the region via Ukrainian territory was according to the UA:PBC a falsified certificate. On 16 February 2022 UA:PBC, stated it had decided to "cease her participation" and that "the artist agreed with this decision of the organizing committee".

Release history

References 

2022 songs
2022 singles
Withdrawn Eurovision songs
2022 controversies